James William "Jack" Whitehouse (12 August 1861 – June 1933) was an English footballer who played at outside right. He was born in West Bromwich and played for Holy Trinity F.C. and West Bromwich Rovers, before joining West Bromwich Albion in August 1880. He retired in May 1884.

Footnotes

References
Citations

Sources

1861 births
1933 deaths
Sportspeople from West Bromwich
English footballers
West Bromwich Albion F.C. players
Association football midfielders